The Loring Building is an historic structure located at 764 5th Avenue in San Diego's Gaslamp Quarter, in the U.S. state of California. It was built in 1873.

See also
 List of Gaslamp Quarter historic buildings

External links

 

1873 establishments in California
Buildings and structures completed in 1873
Buildings and structures in San Diego
Gaslamp Quarter, San Diego